The Extreme Fox is a 2014 period fantasy romance film directed by Wellson Chin. A China-Hong Kong co-production, the film was released on March 14, 2014.

Cast
Chrissie Chau
Alex Fong
Lam Suet
Renata Tan
A-Wei
Jun-qi Huang
Jianbo Zhang
Zifen Tsai
Zehu Yang
Weiming Meng
Zaidong Hao
He Meitian
Kangxi Jia
Hailong Yin
Fulin Fan

Reception
The film earned  at the Chinese box office.

References

External links
 

2010s romantic fantasy films
2010s Cantonese-language films
Chinese romantic fantasy films
Hong Kong fantasy films
Hong Kong romance films
2010s Mandarin-language films
2010s Hong Kong films